"Megamix" (also known as "Miami Hit Mix") is a song by Cuban American singer and songwriter Gloria Estefan. It was released in late 1992 in Europe, the UK and Colombia under the title "Miami Hit Mix", and under the title "Megamix" in Australia, Mexico and the B-Side of "Christmas Through Your Eyes", a holiday song, in the Netherlands. The song was released as a B-Side on Gloria's 1993 "I See Your Smile" in the US and on the 1993 US Maxi Single "Go Away". It peaked at number eight in the UK.

Song history
The "Megamix", as it was called internationally, also known as the "Miami Hitmix" in the UK, was a medley of the greatest hits by the Miami Sound Machine and Gloria Estefan.  In order of appearance in the "Megamix", the medley includes the following songs:
"Dr. Beat"
"Conga"
"Rhythm Is Gonna Get You"
"1-2-3"
"Get on Your Feet"

The remix was produced by Estefan's remix creators, Pablo Flores and Javier Garza. The video of the song is included on her Everlasting Gloria! video collection and features footage from Estefan's official videos from 1984-1992, as well as footage of her live performances.

Charts

Track listings and formats

"Miami Hit Mix"

"Megamix"

"Christmas Through Your Eyes"

References

1992 singles
Gloria Estefan songs
1992 songs
Epic Records singles